Dhimitër Kacimbra (1875 – 1950) was an Albanian lawyer and politician who served as the 2nd Chairman of the National Council of Albania from 25 September 1920 to 15 November 1920.

Early life 
Kacimbra was born in 1875 in Përmet, a small town in southeastern Albania. After attending a local Greek school, he went on to study for two years at the Faculty of Justice, University of Istanbul. Between 1903–1908, Kacimbra served as a lawyer in Meçovë and also taught Ottoman Turkish in Greek schools. From 1908–1912, he became a member of the initial courts in Margëlliç, Vlorë and Himarë. Five years later he served as a notary public in Përmet.

Political career 
As a political activist, Kacimbra participated at the Congress of Lushnjë and Durrës. He was elected member of the parliament during the period between 1920–1924 and 1932–1944, representing Gjirokastër. In 1920 he was appointed as Chairman of the National Council and in the following year would serve as Minister of Justice. In 1929, Kacimbra participated at the 2nd Congress of the Albanian Autocephalous Orthodox Church and in that same year was appointed as Prosecutor of the Control Council, a post he held for three years. He died during the 1950s.

References

Speakers of the Parliament of Albania
Members of the Parliament of Albania
Congress of Durrës delegates
People from Përmet
1875 births
1950 deaths
People from Janina vilayet